Ethan Warren (born 2 October 1991) is an Australian diver.

Diving Career 
Ethan first received his Australian Institute of Sport scholarship in 2009, which allowed him to focus on his diving career.

Some of career highlights include winning two silver medals at the 2010 Commonwealth Games in the 3 m synchro springboard and 10 m synchro platform, both times alongside teammate Matthew Mitcham. His proudest achievement in his career is his Gold Medal from the Canada Grand Prix May 2012, where he was victorious against the Canadian diving legend Alexander Despatie on his home ground.

He competed at the 2012 Summer Olympics in the men's 3 metre springboard, classifying 7th after finishing first in the 2012 Australian Open Championships in the same event; he has also been the 2011 10 m synchronized Australian champion with partner James Connor.

Ethan Warren retired from competitive diving in early 2013.

In early 2014, Ethan joined the Australian Regular Army, where he is still serving within the role of [Operator Movements].

Health Concerns 
Whilst training in the lead up to the London 2012 Olympic Games, Ethan suffered a heart infection called Myocarditis which impeded on his training ability. This infection meant that he missed out on competing for the Shanghai World Titles, and also was banned from training for three months. Thankfully he made a full recovery from the infection, and was able to successfully compete.

References

External links
Ethan Warren's profile on the London 2012 Olympics website 

Divers at the 2012 Summer Olympics
Olympic divers of Australia
Living people
1991 births
Divers at the 2010 Commonwealth Games
Australian male divers
Commonwealth Games silver medallists for Australia
Commonwealth Games medallists in diving
21st-century Australian people
Sportsmen from Queensland
Medallists at the 2010 Commonwealth Games